Mike Hambrick (born in Tyler, Texas) is an American television anchor, reporter, and correspondent who has worked on network television stations such as WJLA-TV in  Washington, D.C., WRC-TV in Washington, D.C.,  KTVT-TV in Dallas, KTAR-TV (now KPNX) in Phoenix, WPXI-TV in Pittsburgh, Pennsylvania, and WBAL-TV in Baltimore in 1975. Hambrick was also a news anchor for WPXI-TV in Pittsburgh, where he also served as managing editor.

Early life
Hambrick grew up in Northeast Texas, where he began his broadcasting career. At age 15, he worked for his local radio station broadcasting disk jockey. Hambrick's TV news career to him to Memphis, Cleveland, Dallas-Ft.Worth, Washington D.C and New York. He retired from TV News after many years in Washington D.C.

Family
He is brother to veteran newscasters Judd Hambrick, and John Hambrick, and the uncle of newscaster Jack Hambrick (John's son). Hambrick is divorced. He has three children and six grandchildren.

Awards and honors
Hambrick has won a number of awards for his work, which include:
 Several Emmy awards 
 Edward R. Murrow Award for Excellence in Broadcasting for his documentary about the D-Day invasion during the World War II

America's Business News anchor 

America’s Business with Mike Hambrick was a one-hour weekly news and information program. Hambrick's second nationally syndicated radio program was Freedomline with Mike Hambrick and was acclaimed by Radio America Network as "an exceptional newsmagazine program and an important voice the defense of the rights of individuals."

References

Sources
 America's Business News summary and Mike Hambrick Biography 
 America's Business News Official Website

1949 births
Television personalities from Tulsa, Oklahoma
Living people
People from Mount Pleasant, Texas
American television reporters and correspondents
Television anchors from Baltimore
20th-century American journalists
American male journalists